Glyphodes bradleyi is a moth in the family Crambidae. It was described by George Hampson in 1909. It is found on Guadalcanal in the Solomon Islands.

References

Moths described in 1909
Glyphodes